Game Description Language, or GDL, is a logic programming language designed by Michael Genesereth for general game playing, as part of the General Game Playing Project at Stanford University. GDL describes the state of a game as a series of facts, and the game mechanics as logical rules. GDL is hereby one of alternative representations for game theoretic problems.

Purpose of GDL
Quoted in an article in New Scientist, Genesereth pointed out that although Deep Blue is able to play chess at a grandmaster level, it is incapable of playing checkers at all because it is a specialized game player. Both chess and checkers can be described in GDL. This enables general game players to be built that can play both of these games and any other game that can be described using GDL.

Specification

Syntax 

GDL is a variant of Datalog, and the syntax is largely the same. It is usually given in prefix notation. Variables begin with "?".

Keywords 

The following is the list of keywords in GDL, along with brief descriptions of their functions:

distinct
This predicate is used to require that two terms be syntactically different.

does
The predicate does(?r,?m) means that player (or role) ?r makes move ?m in the current game state.

goal
The predicate goal(?r,?n) is used to define goal value ?n (usually a natural number between 0 and 100) for role ?r in the current state.

init
This predicate refers to a true fact about the initial game state.

legal
The predicate legal(?r,?m) means that ?m is a legal move for role ?r in the current state.

next
This predicate refers to a true fact about the next game state.

role
This predicate is used to add the name of a player.

terminal
This predicate means that the current state is terminal.

true
This predicate refers to a true fact about the current game state.

Rules 

A game description in GDL provides complete rules for each of the following elements of a game.

Players 
Facts that define the roles in a game. The following example is from a GDL description of the two-player game Tic-tac-toe:
(role xplayer)
(role oplayer)

Initial state 
Rules that entail all facts about the initial game state. An example is:
(init (cell 1 1 blank))
...
(init (cell 3 3 blank))
(init (control xplayer))

Legal moves 
Rules that describe each move by the conditions on the current position under which it can be taken by a player. An example is:
(<= (legal ?player (mark ?m ?n))
    (true (cell ?m ?n blank))
    (true (control ?player)))

Game state update 
Rules that describe all facts about the next state relative to the current state and the moves taken by the players. An example is:
(<= (next (cell ?m ?n x))
    (does xplayer (mark ?m ?n)))
(<= (next (cell ?m ?n o))
    (does oplayer (mark ?m ?n)))

Termination 
Rules that describe the conditions under which the current state is a terminal one. An example is:
(<= terminal
    (line x))
(<= terminal
    (line o))
(<= terminal
    not boardopen)

Goal states 
The goal values for each player in a terminal state. An example is:
(<= (goal xplayer 100)
    (line x))
(<= (goal oplayer 0)
    (line x))

Extensions

GDL-II
With GDL, one can describe finite games with an arbitrary numbers of players. However, GDL cannot describe games which contain an element of chance (for example, rolling dice) or games where players have incomplete information about the current state of the game (for example, in many card games the opponents' cards are not visible). GDL-II, the Game Description Language for Incomplete Information Games, extends GDL by two keywords that allow for the description of elements of chance and incomplete information:

sees
The predicate sees(?r,?p) means that role ?r perceives ?p in the next game state.

random
This constant refers to a pre-defined player who chooses moves randomly.

The following is an example from a GDL-II description of the card game Texas hold 'em:
(<= (sees ?player ?card)
    (does random (deal_face_down ?player ?card)))
(<= (sees ?r ?card)
    (role ?r)
    (does random (deal_river ?card)))

GDL-III
Michael Thielscher also created a further extension, GDL-III, a general game description language with imperfect information and introspection, that supports the specification of epistemic games — ones characterised by rules that depend on the knowledge of players.

Other formalisms and languages for game representation

In classical game theory, games can be formalised in extensive and normal forms. For cooperative game theory, games are represented using characteristic functions. Some subclasses of games allow special representations in smaller sizes also known as succinct games. 
Some of the newer developments of formalisms and languages for representation of some subclasses of games or representations adjusted to the needs of interdisciplinary research are summarized as the following table. Some of these alternative representations also encode time related aspects:

Applications

A 2016 paper "describes a multilevel algorithm compiling a general game description in GDL into an optimized reasoner in a low level language".

A 2017 paper uses GDL to model the process of mediating a resolution to a dispute between two parties, and presented an algorithm that uses available information efficiently to do so.

See also
General Game Playing
Artificial Intelligence

References

External links
Game Description Language Specification
Refereed paper introducing GDL-II

Game artificial intelligence
Game theory
Logic programming languages